Kamionna  is a village in the administrative district of Gmina Trzciana, within Bochnia County, Lesser Poland Voivodeship, in southern Poland.

The village has a population of 770.

In the course of the Josephine colonization Catholic and Lutheran Germans settled here in 1785.

References

Kamionna